52nd Street is the sixth studio album by American singer-songwriter Billy Joel, released on October 11, 1978, as the follow-up to his breakthrough album, The Stranger. Joel tried to give the new album a fresh sound, hiring various jazz musicians to differentiate it from his previous albums.

It was the first of four Joel albums to top the Billboard charts, and it earned him two Grammys. Three songs reached the Top 40 in the United States, contributing to the album's success: "My Life" (number 3), "Big Shot" (number 14), and "Honesty" (number 24). It was similarly well received by critics, earning the 1979 Grammy for Album of the Year. This Grammy was presented to its producer, Phil Ramone. Upon Ramone's death, 52nd Streets Album of the Year Grammy was passed on to Joel. 

The album was among the first commercially released on the compact disc format, reaching store shelves on October 1, 1982, in Japan (it was one of 50 CDs released that day, including The Stranger, but bore the first catalogue number in the sequence, 35DP-1, and so is frequently cited as the first to be released). In keeping with this history, it was also the first release when Sony returned to manufacturing vinyl records in 2018.

The title is a reference to 52nd Street, one of New York City's jazz centers in the middle of the century. Joel's label was headquartered on 52nd Street (in the CBS Building) at the time of the album's release. The studio where recording took place was also on 52nd Street, one block away from the CBS Building.

Reception

Reviewing 52nd Street for The Village Voice in 1979, Robert Christgau noted Joel's talent for writing catchy songs and likened him to Elton John, albeit with more "smarm".

Retrospectively, AllMusic editor Stephen Thomas Erlewine praises Joel for expanding stylistically on 1977's The Stranger, describing 52nd Street as "more sophisticated and somewhat jazzy." In 2000, it was voted number 621 in Colin Larkin's All Time Top 1000 Albums. In 2003, 52nd Street was ranked number 352 on Rolling Stone magazine's list of The 500 Greatest Albums of All Time, and at 354 on a 2012 revised list.

Track listing
All songs written and composed by Billy Joel.

Song notes
The song "Rosalinda's Eyes" was inspired by Joel's mother, Rosalind Nyman Joel.

Personnel 

 Billy Joel – vocals, acoustic piano, Yamaha CP-70 electric grand piano, Fender Rhodes, synthesizers
 Richie Cannata – organ, saxophones, clarinet
 Steve Khan – electric guitar, acoustic guitar, backing vocals
 David Spinozza – acoustic guitar (2)
 David Brown – electric guitar (3)
 Russell Javors – acoustic guitar (3)
 Hugh McCracken – nylon guitar (6, 8)
 Eric Gale – electric guitar (7)
 Doug Stegmeyer – bass, backing vocals
 Liberty DeVitto – drums
 Mike Mainieri – vibraphone and marimba (4, 6)
 Ralph MacDonald – percussion (6, 7)
 David Freidman – orchestral chimes and percussion (8)
 Freddie Hubbard – flugelhorn and trumpet (4)
 George Marge – sopranino recorder (6)
 Robert Freedman – horn and string orchestrations (2, 8)
 Dave Grusin – horn orchestrations (7)
 David Nadien – concertmaster (2, 7, 8)
 Peter Cetera – backing vocals (3)
 Donnie Dacus – backing vocals (3)
 Frank Floyd – backing vocals (7)
 Babi Floyd – backing vocals (7)
 Milt Grayson – backing vocals (7)
 Zack Sanders – backing vocals (7)
 Ray Simpson – backing vocals (7)

Production 
 Phil Ramone – producer, mixing
 Kathy Kurs – associate producer
 Carol Peters – associate producer
 Jim Boyer – engineer, mixing
 David Martone – assistant engineer
 Ted Jensen – mastering at Sterling Sound (New York City, NY)
 John Berg – cover design
 Jim Houghton – photography

Accolades

Grammy Awards

|-
|  style="width:35px; text-align:center;" rowspan="3"|1980 || rowspan="2"| 52nd Street || Album of the Year || 
|-
| Best Pop Vocal Performance – Male || 
|-
|"Honesty" || |Song of the Year || 
|-

American Music Awards

|-
|  style="width:35px; text-align:center;" rowspan="1"|1980 || Billy Joel (performer) || Favorite Pop/Rock Male Artist|| 
|-

Charts

Weekly charts

Year-end charts

Certifications and sales

References

1978 albums
Billy Joel albums
Grammy Award for Album of the Year
Grammy Award for Best Male Pop Vocal Performance
Albums produced by Phil Ramone
Columbia Records albums